Rauner College Prep is a public four-year charter high school located in the West Town in Chicago, Illinois. It is a part of the Noble Network of Charter Schools. Rauner College Prep is named in honor of donors Diana and Bruce Rauner. It opened in 2006 and serves students in grades nine through twelve.

References

External links
Noble Network of Charter Schools
TheCharterSCALE: Rauner College Prep

Educational institutions established in 2006
Noble Network of Charter Schools
Public high schools in Chicago
2006 establishments in Illinois